Trill Entertainment Presents: Survival of the Fittest is a compilation album by Trill Entertainment, featuring rappers Lil' Boosie, Foxx, and Webbie.

Track listing

Charts

Weekly charts

Year-end charts

References

Hip hop compilation albums
2007 compilation albums
Trill Entertainment compilation albums
Lil Boosie albums
Record label compilation albums
Gangsta rap compilation albums